This is a list of the National Register of Historic Places listings in Caldwell County, Texas.

This is intended to be a complete list of properties and districts listed on the National Register of Historic Places in Caldwell County, Texas. There are one district and five individual properties listed on the National Register in the county. Two individually listed properties are Recorded Texas Historic Landmarks while the district contains several more Recorded Texas Historic Landmarks including one that is also a State Antiquities Landmark.

Current listings

The locations of National Register properties and districts may be seen in a mapping service provided.

|}

See also

National Register of Historic Places listings in Texas
Recorded Texas Historic Landmarks in Caldwell County

References

External links

Caldwell County, Texas
Caldwell County
Buildings and structures in Caldwell County, Texas